The 2010 Strathcona County municipal election was held Monday, October 18, 2010. Since 1968, provincial legislation has required every municipality to hold triennial elections. The citizens of Strathcona County, (this includes the Urban Service Area of Sherwood Park,) Alberta, elected one mayor, five of their eight councillors (one from each of eight wards), four of the Elk Island Public Schools Regional Division No. 14's nine trustees (3 from subdivision #2, and 1 from subdivision #3), and four of the Elk Island Catholic Separate Regional Division No. 41's seven trustees (supporters in Sherwood Park). Three incumbent councillors had no challengers, and the candidate for public school trustee Strathcona County south had no challengers.

Results
Bold indicates elected, and incumbents are italicized.

Mayor

Councillors

Public School Trustees
The Elk Island Public School Board consists of nine trustees, one from Lamont County, two from Fort Saskatchewan, three from Sherwood Park (subdivision 2), one from Strathcona County north (subdivision 3), one from Strathcona County south (subdivision 4), and one from the County of Minburn No. 27.

Separate School Trustees
The Elk Island Catholic Separate School Board consists of seven trustees, four from Sherwood Park, one from Camrose, one from Vegreville, and one from Fort Saskatchewan.

By-election
Following being elected as an MLA in the April 2012 provincial election, Ward 5 Councillor Jacquie Fenske resigned her seat on council. A by-election was held on June 25, 2012, this time being contested by four residents.

References

External links
Strathcona County Election 2010

2010 Alberta municipal elections
2010